Ana Šargić (born c. 1983) is a Serbian model. She was the 2002 Miss Yugoslavia winner.

Miss World 2002
Šargić was the official representative of her country to the Miss World 2002 pageant held at the Alexandra Palace in London, United Kingdom, where she placed as one of the top 20 semi-finalists of the competition.

References

External links
 Miss Serbia official site
 Pageantopolis - Miss World 2002
 interview on Serbian
 [www.mrs-serbia.com]

1980s births
Living people
Serbian female models
Miss World 2002 delegates
Miss Serbia winners
Serbian beauty pageant winners